The Women’s Prize for Non-Fiction is a prize for non-fiction writing by women, a sister prize to the Women's Prize for Fiction. It was announced in February 2023 and will first be awarded in 2024, for books published in 2023. Its main prize of £30,000 will be funded for three years by the Charlotte Aitken Trust, and the winner will also receive a statuette named the Charlotte.

Kate Mosse, announcing the launch of the prize, said it was "not about taking the spotlight away from the brilliant male writers, it's about adding the women in".

References

Literary awards honoring women
Non-fiction literary awards